John Field may refer to:

John Field (American football) (1886–1979), American football player and coach
John Field (brigadier) (1899–1974), Australian Army officer
John Field (composer) (1782–1837), Irish composer
John Field (dancer) (1921–1991), British dancer of the Royal Ballet
John Field (Puritan) (1545–1588), British Puritan
John Field (astronomer) (1520/30–1587), English astronomer
John Field (racing driver), American racing driver in the 2001 Petit Le Mans
John Field (songwriter) (born 1962), Australian songwriter and musician
John A. Field Jr. (1910–1995), U.S. federal judge
John Osbaldiston Field (1913–1985), governor of Saint Helena
John Field (clothing), outdoor clothes for hunting
John Collard Field (1822–1903), member of the Legislative Assembly of Ontario
John Edwin Field, British physicist

See also 
John Field Simms, U.S. politician from New Mexico
John Field-Richards (1878–1959), British racer
John Feild (disambiguation)
John Fields (disambiguation)
Jack Fields (disambiguation)